Masoro may refer to:

West African Pepper
Masoro, Rwanda